Enrique de Mesa (April 9, 1878 - May 27, 1929) was a Spanish poet.

Spanish literary critics
Spanish theatre critics
Spanish poets
1878 births
1929 deaths
Spanish male poets